Archibald Wager was an 18th-century civil servant in colonial Virginia. Wager served as the Clerk of Court for three counties: Hampshire County (1755–1757), Brunswick County (1757–1760), and Frederick County (1760–1762). Following his service as a Clerk of Court, Wager managed the construction of public roads in Frederick County in 1763.

Political career 
Following the creation of Hampshire County in 1754, Archibald Wager was appointed to serve as the county's inaugural Clerk of Court in 1755 according to records of the court from June 11 of that year. While Wager was mentioned as the first Clerk of Court, it is unknown where the first county court was held; however, it is known that Thomas Bryan Martin, nephew of Thomas Fairfax, 6th Lord Fairfax of Cameron, was the county's first appointed justice. Under the act establishing Hampshire County, the county's court was to be held in June 1754; however, it was not until 1757 that formal record keeping was actualized in Hampshire County, due in part to the ongoing French and Indian War and repeated Native American attacks. Throughout Wager's tenure in the position, Hampshire County suffered the worst of its incursions by Native Americans, which caused many settlers to flee their homes and settlements. In 1757, Gabriel Jones was appointed to replace Wager as the county's Clerk of Court. Even though Wager was likely the first appointed Clerk of Court for Hampshire County, his successor Jones was the first operational appointee to serve in the position.

Wager was next commissioned to serve as the fourth Clerk of Court for Brunswick County by Deputy Secretary of Virginia Thomas Nelson, thus replacing Littleton Tazewell, father of United States Senator Henry Tazewell. Wager's commission to the post was qualified on April 26, 1757 and he remained in that position for three years until February 5, 1760. Wager was replaced in his position by John Robinson.

Subsequent to the death of the Frederick County Clerk of Court, Col. James Wood during the winter of 1759–60, Wager was appointed his replacement by Deputy Secretary Nelson, acting as governor, at the county court held February 5, 1760. Col. Wood's nineteen-year-old son James Wood, later a Governor of Virginia, was appointed to serve as Wager's deputy clerk on May 7, 1760. During his tenure, the Frederick County Court was steadily called upon for assistance in building forts and stockades to protect outlying settlements against further Native American attacks. Wager served as the Clerk of Court for about two years until May 4, 1762, when he was succeeded by James Keith, who was duly sworn and qualified after he produced a commission granted to him by Virginia Secretary Nelson. The reasons for Wager's termination from the position are not known.

Following his service as Clerk of Court, Wager managed the construction of county roads with public monies. On November 3, 1762, the Frederick County Court chose Wager as the "appointed overseer" of the road between Stephensburg (present-day Stephens City) and the "Nations" plantation of Lord Fairfax and supervised the road's construction by tithables (workers paid with public tax monies) under his charge.

Personal life 
In 1761, Wager produced 200 pounds of tobacco, which was received and certified by Secretary Nelson and Wager's Deputy Clerk of Court Wood on January 2, 1762.

Wager was a practicing Anglican. According to Frederick County Parish records, Wager's signature was listed among those who participated in the Eucharist between 1761 and 1763.

References

Explanatory notes

Citations

Bibliography

Further reading

American planters
British North American Anglicans
County clerks in Virginia
People from Brunswick County, Virginia
People from Frederick County, Virginia
People from Hampshire County, West Virginia
People of pre-statehood West Virginia
Virginia colonial people
West Virginia colonial people